Kitsuka Dam is a gravity dam located in Shimane Prefecture in Japan. The dam is used for power production. The catchment area of the dam is 62 km2. The dam impounds about 20  ha of land when full and can store 2526 thousand cubic meters of water. The construction of the dam was started on 1959 and completed in 1961.

References

Dams in Shimane Prefecture
1961 establishments in Japan